The long-thumbed frog, Fletcher's frog or barking marsh frog (Limnodynastes fletcheri) is a species of non-burrowing ground frog native to south-eastern Australia. The species belongs to the genus Limnodynastes. The twelve species in the genus are characterised by a lack of toe pads. Following phylogenetic analysis, the species was placed in L. peronii clade group alongside L. depressus, L. tasmaniensis and L. peronii.

Description

The long-thumbed frog is a medium-sized frog reaching about 50 mm in length. It is grey or brown with abnormal shaped darker patches or irregular spots, and in most individuals a butterfly-shaped patch between the eyes. There is normally a red or purplish patch above the eye. It is similar in many respects to L. tasmaniensis from which it can be most reliably distinguished by its call. The belly is white. The tympanum is indistinct.

Distribution and habitat 
This species inhabits drier areas west of the ranges of New South Wales as well as southern Queensland, northern Victoria and eastern South Australia. It is associated with rivers, dams and creeks (often temporary) in woodland and grassland. During drier conditions they shelter under rocks, in cracked mud and yabby burrows.

Behaviour and ecology

Males make a dog-like "rok" or "whrup" call from grassy areas around the edge of water bodies, after rain or when water levels are high, during spring to autumn. Breeding occurs mostly after heavy rain and eggs are laid in a floating foamy mass, often attached to vegetation. Eggs and tadpoles are generally found in slow moving or still waters Tadpoles can reach up to 69 mm and as an opportunistic breeder metamorphosis can occur at any time of the year. The tadpoles are very similar to Limnodynastes tasmaniensis and cannot be readily distinguished until metamorphosis.

As a pet 
In Australia, this species may be kept in captivity with a license.

Conservation 
Although the species population is considered 'Least Concern' under the IUCN Red List and stable, L. fletcheri threatened by habitat loss. The species is also becoming increasingly threatened by altered flow regimes across Australia's rivers. There is a positive relationship between flooding frequency and the breeding activity for L. fletcheri Flooding between September and December is required to maximise breeding responses from the species, this will increase the likelihood of species persistence and diversity.  Therefore, the species may be negatively affected by regulatory activities such as damming and would respond positively to environmental flow management

References

Further reading 

Anstis, M. (2013). Tadpoles and Frogs of Australia. New Holland: Sydney.
Tyler, M. J. (2013) Field Guide to the Frogs of Australia Revised Edition. CSIRO: Melbourne
Robinson, M. (2002). A Field Guide to Frogs of Australia. Australian Museum/ New Holland: Sydney.
Hero, J. M., Littlejohn, M. & Marantelli, G. (1991). Frogwatch Field Guide to Victorian Frogs. Department of Conservation and Environment: East Melbourne.

External links 
 Atlas of Living Australia
 Encyclopedia of Life

Amphibians of Queensland
Amphibians of New South Wales
Amphibians of Victoria (Australia)
Amphibians of South Australia
Limnodynastes
Amphibians described in 1888
Frogs of Australia